Stull Run is a stream in the U.S. state of West Virginia.

Stull Run is named after a local pioneer who was ambushed and killed by Indians.

See also
List of rivers of West Virginia

References

Rivers of Marshall County, West Virginia
Rivers of West Virginia